Agua Chinon Creek or Agua Chinon Wash is an urban stream in the city of Irvine, Orange County, California.

The area includes the badlands known as The Sinks, which are nicknamed "the Grand Canyon of Orange County" due to its sheer cliffs. At the bottom of the canyons Agua Chinon Creek flows under State Route 241 and is impounded by the Agua Chinon Debris Dam, which provides flood control to the valley below.

The middle section of Agua Chinon Creek flows through a culvert underneath the former El Toro Marine Corps Air Station. The redevelopment of the air base as Orange County Great Park includes plans to daylight the creek and restore streambank habitat. This work is proposed to create a wildlife corridor between the Cleveland National Forest and the Laguna Coast wilderness area (Crystal Cove State Park).

Below the Air Base/Great Park the creek continues in a buried channel under the BNSF Railway tracks, Interstate 5 and the Irvine Spectrum Center, and is joined from the left by its main tributary, Borrego Canyon Wash. It emerges as an open channel just a few hundred feet before its confluence with San Diego Creek. The confluence is situated just north of the Interstate 405 near the 405/133 interchange.

See also
List of rivers of California
List of rivers of Orange County, California

References

Rivers of Orange County, California